The Cave of Pëllumbas is a karst cave in central Albania, located in the Skorana Gorge close to the village of Pëllumbas in Tirana County. The cave is one of among six karstic caves that exist in Europe.

Despite its small size it is regarded as one of the country's most beautiful caves and attracts numerous visitors. The cave is situated within the boundaries of Dajti National Park and has been recognised as a natural monument of national and international importance by the Ministry of Environment. The importance of the complex is due to the remains of ancient human culture which belongs to the Paleolithic. The cave was inhabited by the extinct cave bear, which lived between 10,000 and 400,000 years ago.

See also  
 Prehistoric Albania
 Geography of Albania
 Protected areas of Albania 
 Dajti National Park

References 

 

Caves of Albania
Geography of Tirana County
Tourist attractions in Tirana County
Limestone caves
Dajti National Park